The 14th Pahang State election was held on 9 May 2018, concurrently with the 2018 Malaysian general election. The previous state election was held on 5 May 2013. The state assemblymen is elected to 5 years term each.

The Pahang State Legislative Assembly would automatically dissolve on 1 July 2018, the fifth anniversary of the first sitting, and elections must be held within sixty days (two months) of the dissolution (on or before 1 September 2018, with the date to be decided by the Election Commission), unless dissolved prior to that date by the Head of State (Sultan of Pahang) on the advice of the Head of Government (Menteri Besar of Pahang).

Barisan Nasional (BN) continued their government of the state, winning 25 out of 42 seats, reduced from 29 in the 2013 election. Pakatan Harapan won 9 seats, while Pan-Malaysian Islamic Party (PAS) won 8 seats, an increase of 6 seats from the last election. BN's Wan Rosdy Wan Ismail was sworn in as new Menteri Besar on 11 May 2018, replacing incumbent and 4-term Menteri Besar Adnan Yaakob. The state EXCO members were also sworn in on the same date.

Contenders

Barisan Nasional (BN) is set to contest all 42 seats in Pahang State Legislative Assembly. Barisan Nasional (BN) linchpin party United Malays National Organisation (UMNO) is to set to contest major share of Barisan Nasional (BN) seats.

Pan-Malaysian Islamic Party (PAS) is set to contest all 42 seats in Pahang.

Pakatan Harapan have decided to contest all 42 seats in Pahang. However, Pakatan Harapan has yet to finalize in 1 or 2 seats. On 17 March 2018, Pakatan Harapan has completed the distribution of seats in Pahang. People's Justice Party (PKR) will contest in 14 seats while the National Trust Party (Amanah) will have 11 seats. Malaysian United Indigenous Party (Bersatu) and the Democratic Action Party (DAP) will contest 9 and 8 seats.

Parti Sosialis Malaysia (PSM) will contest in Jelai.

Party contesting by election symbol
Barisan Nasional (National Front)

  Pakatan Harapan (Alliance Of Hope)

  Gagasan Sejahtera (Ideas of Prosperity)

 Socialist Party of Malaysia (Parti Sosialis Malaysia)

The contested seats

Barisan Nasional (National Front)

  Pakatan Harapan (Alliance Of Hope)

  Gagasan Sejahtera (Ideas of Prosperity)

Election pendulum

The 14th General Election witnessed 25 governmental seats and 17 non-governmental seats filled the Pahang State Legislative Assembly. The government side has 2 safe seats and 4 fairly safe seats, while the non-government side has 4 safe seats, but has no fairly safe seat.

Results

Seats that changed allegiance

References

Pahang state elections
Pahang
Pahang